The Good House is a horror novel by American writer Tananarive Due, first published in 2003 by Atria Books. The story follows Angela Toussaint as she returns to her late grandmother's home in Sacajawea, Washington.

Plot Summary 
The home that belonged to Angela Toussaint's late grandmother is so beloved that townspeople in Sacajawea, Washington, call it the Good House. But that all changes one summer when an unexpected tragedy takes place behind its closed doors...and the Toussaint's family history -- and future -- is dramatically transformed. Angela has not returned to the Good House since her son, Corey, died there two years ago. But now, Angela is finally ready to return to her hometown and go beyond the grave to unearth the truth about Corey's death. Could it be related to a terrifying entity Angela's grandmother battled seven decades ago? And what about the other senseless calamities that Sacajawea has seen in recent years? Has Angela's grandmother, an African American woman reputed to have "powers," put a curse on the entire community?

Reviews
 Horror Books: The Old Horror and the New Dark Fantasy By MARK ATHITAKIS, The New York Times, October 31, 2004
 Black Girl Nerds: The Good House by Tananarive Due

References 

2003 American novels
American horror novels
Novels by Tananarive Due
African-American novels